Charles-André "Chuck" Comeau  (born 17 September 1979) is a Canadian musician and drummer, best known for being the drummer of the rock band Simple Plan. He also founded the apparel company Role Model Clothing along with his bandmate Pierre Bouvier and the band's best friend, Patrick Langlois. He is also former drummer for the punk rock band Reset from 1993 to 1999, which he quit to form Simple Plan with his bandmate who also left Reset, Pierre Bouvier.

Early life
Comeau was born to Françoise and André Comeau, his brother's name is Louis, he his currently the uncle of Mathieu Comeau. Chuck Comeau attended Beaubois high school in Montreal, Quebec, along with bandmates Pierre Bouvier, Sébastien Lefebvre, and Jeff Stinco, where they formed Simple Plan. Comeau originally studied law at McGill University in Montreal, but left to pursue his music career.

Career

Reset (1993–1999)
Comeau start his music career in 1993, when he was 13 years old along with bandmate Pierre Bouvier. Comeau left Reset in 1998 to study law on McGill University, and left to pursue music career, he later reunited with Bouvier at a Sugar Ray concert, they later formed Simple Plan in 1999 along with old schoolmates Sébastien Lefebvre and Jeff Stinco. Later, David Desrosiers replaced Bouvier and Reset but only last for 6 months and left Reset to join Simple Plan.

Comeau has released 1 album with reset: No Worries (1997)

Simple Plan (1999–present)
After leaving Reset, Comeau became the drummer for Simple Plan. Simple Plan has sold more than 15 million records worldwide.

Comeau has released all albums with Simple Plan: No Pads, No Helmets...Just Balls (2002), Still, Not Getting Any (2004), Simple Plan (2008), Get Your Heart On! (2011) and Taking One for the Team (2016). Simple Plan has released 2 EPs: Live in Anaheim (2004) and Get Your Heart On – The Second Coming! (2013). Simple Plan has released 2 live albums: Live in Japan 2002 (2003) and MTV Hard Rock Live (2005). Simple Plan has also released a video album which Comeau directs it, titled A Big Package for You (2002).

Clothing line
In 2001, before the band signed to a major label, Comeau, Bouvier and their longtime best friend Patrick Langolis launched the apparel company Role Model Clothing before the band was signed to a record deal in an effort to create clothes that represented their lifestyle and their love of music. And in some music videos of Simple Plan it can be seen that the band members are using the clothes. Role Model Clothing has an apparel collection. Ever since 2010, the brand stopped being active mostly due to Simple Plan being very busy working on (and later promoting) their fourth studio album Get Your Heart On!. In an interview for SimplePlan.cz in 2013, Comeau explained the "hiatus" of their clothing line and talked a bit more about its future:

In 2017, when Simple Plan's debut album celebrated its 15th anniversary, the band brought back two "old-school designs" of Role Model Clothing, which were available for a limited time in their merch stand.

Directing
Comeau directed and starred in Simple Plan's video album A Big Package for You (2002).

Equipment
He currently uses DW drums, pedals and hardware, Remo Drumheads, Promark Drumsticks and Zildjian cymbals. His kit configures of two floor toms, one rack tom, a bass drum, and a snare drum.

Personal life
Comeau married Jacquelin Napal on July 8, 2014 in Los Angeles and on July 1, 2015 the couple had their first son, London Alexander Comeau. During a concert with Simple Plan in Detroit, a fan threw a glass bottle towards the stage, which hit Comeau in the face. He had to play the whole show with his face full of blood. After the concert, they went to the hospital and Comeau received 4 stitches to his nose and below his teeth.

Influences
Comeau has been influenced by Blink-182, Good Charlotte, Linkin Park, Sugar Ray, The Beach Boys, Nirvana, Foo Fighters and Guns N' Roses.

Discography

Simple Plan
 No Pads, No Helmets...Just Balls (2002)
 Still, Not Getting Any... (2004)
 Simple Plan (2008)
 Get Your Heart On! (2011)
 Taking One for the Team (2016)
 Harder Than It Looks (2022)

References

1979 births
Living people
Canadian male voice actors
Canadian rock drummers
Simple Plan members
21st-century Canadian drummers
Reset (Canadian band) members